Stefan Bachmann is a Swiss–American author of children's literature, non-fiction, and short stories, as well as a musician, composer, and artist. He is best known for his debut novel, The Peculiar, a gothic alternate history novel published by HarperCollins.

Personal life 
Bachmann was born in Colorado in the United States, and grew up in Zürich, Switzerland. At age 11 he began studying classical music at the Zürich Conservatory, where he studied piano under the tutelage of Carl Rütti. As a teenager, he competed in musical competitions, winning national awards for his compositions and performances. He later studied theory and composition at the Zürich University of the Arts, and lived in Berlin, Prague, and Tokyo. His debut novel, The Peculiar, was published by HarperCollins in the United States, and in multiple translations around the world, when he was nineteen years old.

After university, he completed his obligatory military service, undergoing basic training in Bülach, before working as an officer's aid in various locations across Switzerland. In 2022, he became a board member of Autillus, the Swiss Association of Authors and Illustrators. He currently teaches creative writing at the Junges Literaturlabor in Zürich.

Reception 
His books have received critical acclaim from The New York Times, Publishers Weekly, Kirkus, and many others. In 2012, he was chosen by Huffington Post as one of their "18 Under 18," alongside Malala Yousafzai and Tavi Gavinson. In 2017, he was chosen for the Aarhus 39, a selection of the best writers under the age of 40 in Europe, presented at the International Hay Festival in Denmark. His writing has been published in fifteen countries.

Awards

Bibliography

Children's Books 

 The Peculiar (Greenwillow Books/HarperCollins, 2012)
 The Whatnot (Greenwillow Books/HarperCollins, 2013)
 Cinders and Sparrows (Greenwillow Books/HarperCollins, 2020)

Young Adult 

 A Drop of Night (Greenwillow Books/HarperCollins, 2016)

Nonfiction 

 Clandestine (forthcoming from Workman, 2023), in collaboration with April Genevieve Tucholke

Anthologies 

 The Cabinet of Curiosities: 36 Tales Brief & Sinister (Greenwillow Books/HarperCollins, 2014) — a book of short stories by Claire Legrand, Katherine Catmull, and Emma Trevayne; illustrated by Alexander Jansson
 Slasher Girls & Monster Boys (Dial, 2015) — short story collection edited by April Genevieve Tucholke, with stories by Bachmann, Marie Lu, Leigh Bradugo, Jay Kristoff, etc.
 Quest: Stories of Journeys from Around Europe (Alma Books, 2017) — short stories edited by Daniel Hahn, with stories by Bachmann, Katherine Rundell, Maria Turtschaninoff, etc.

References 

Year of birth missing (living people)
Living people
21st-century Swiss novelists
21st-century American novelists
American male novelists
Swiss male novelists
Swiss children's writers
Swiss children's literature